This is the discography of Turkish-Belgian pop singer-songwriter Hadise, who has released seven studio albums.

Hadise gained fame when she appeared on the Belgium version of Pop idol. She later released her debut album, Sweat, and its lead single "Sweat". It produced four more singles: "Stir Me Up", the more successful "Milk Chocolate Girl", "Ain't No Love Lost" and "Bad Boy". She then released her second studio album, "Hadise", which has so far become more commercially successful than her previous album and has thus produced four singles: "A Good Kiss", "My Body", "My Man and the Devil on His Shoulder" and "Deli Oğlan".

Studio albums

Extended plays

Singles

1. Only released in Turkey

B-sides

Guest appearances

Music videos

References

External links
 

Discographies of Belgian artists
Discographies of Turkish artists
Pop music discographies
Rhythm and blues discographies